The 1965 Pittsburgh Panthers football team represented the University of Pittsburgh in the 1965 NCAA University Division football season.  The team compiled a 3–7 record under head coach John Michelosen. The team's statistical leaders included Kenny Lucas with 1,921 passing yards and Barry McKnight with 406 rushing yards.

Schedule

References

Pittsburgh
Pittsburgh Panthers football seasons
Pittsburgh Panthers football